Gérard Krawczyk (17 May 1953, Paris) is a French film director.  He is of Polish descent (his grandparents were from Częstochowa).

Filmography

Director
 Homicide by Night (1984)
 Je hais les acteurs (a.k.a. I hate actors) (1986)
 L'été en pente douce (1987)
 Taxi 2 (2000)
 Wasabi (2001)
 Taxi 3 (2003)
 Fanfan la tulipe (2003)
 La vie est à nous ! (2005)
 Taxi 4 (2007)
 L'Auberge rouge (2007)

Actor
 Papillon du vertige (1987)
 XY, drôle de conception (1996) - L'homme spermogramme #2
 Amour et confusions (1997)
 Héroïnes (1997) - Médecin
 The Messenger: The Story of Joan of Arc (1999) - Church's Peer - Coronation
 Taxi 3 (2003) - Policier Camionnette #2
 La vie est à nous ! (2005) - Un client du bar
 A French Gigolo (2008) - Le patron du bistrot
 Valerian and the City of a Thousand Planets (2017) - Captain Welcoming Martapuraïs

Decorations 
 Chevalier of the Order of Arts and Letters (2016)

References

External links
 

1953 births
Living people
French people of Polish descent
French film directors
French-language film directors
Chevaliers of the Ordre des Arts et des Lettres
Film directors from Paris